The Fake News Show is a British television comedy panel game show that has aired on Channel 4 as a pilot since 6 February 2017 and as a full series from 15 May 2017. It is hosted by Stephen Mangan with Katherine Ryan and Richard Osman as the panellists. The series is produced by Hat Trick Productions for Channel 4. The goal is for the two sort out various news stories and work out if they are true or not.

Format 
The show's title is a reference to the concept of 'fake news', a term popularised by President Donald Trump during the 2016 U.S. presidential election. Throughout the episode, the teams are presented with various popular or sensational news stories taken directly from well known media publishers, and they must then decipher if the information was factual or not. In the pilot episode, thousands of points were awarded for each correct answer and were referred to as 'clicks'. However, in subsequent episodes, only one point was awarded for each correct answer in order to avoid confusion.

Episodes
The coloured backgrounds denote the result of each of the shows:
 – Indicates Richard's team won.
 – Indicates Katherine's team won.
 – Indicates the game ended in a draw.

Pilot (2017)

  The points system was changed after the pilot, which is why so many points were scored in this episode.

Series 1 (2017)

The first two episodes were broadcast on Monday nights, after which the show was moved to Sunday nights.

References

External links 
 

2017 British television series debuts
2017 British television series endings
2010s British comedy television series
2010s British game shows
Channel 4 panel games
British panel games
English-language television shows